Hubbard County is a county in the northwestern part of the U.S. state of Minnesota. As of the 2020 census, the population was 21,344. Its county seat is Park Rapids.

Part of the Leech Lake Indian Reservation is in the county.

History
The county was created on February 26, 1883, with territory partitioned from Cass County. It was named for Lucius Frederick Hubbard, a prominent Territory editor, Civil War participant, and businessman who was governor of Minnesota from 1882 to 1887. The county's boundaries have remained unchanged since its creation.

The new county's courthouse was destroyed by fire around 1890, but the public records were salvaged.

Geography
The county's terrain is hilly, largely wooded, and dotted with lakes and ponds. It generally slopes to the east, with the northern part sloping to the north and the southern part sloping to the south. Its highest point is near the lower middle of its western border, at 1,549' (472m) ASL. There may be such a high point on the border but the accepted high point for this county is the Thorpe Lookout at 1844 feet which is why the forest service maintains a tower there the US Geodetic Survey agrees.47.0962°N, -94.8539° W

Major highways

  U.S. Highway 2
  U.S. Highway 71
  Minnesota State Highway 34
  Minnesota State Highway 64
  Minnesota State Highway 87
  Minnesota State Highway 113
  Minnesota State Highway 200
  Minnesota State Highway 226

Adjacent counties

 Beltrami County - north
 Cass County - east
 Wadena County - south
 Becker County - southwest
 Clearwater County - northwest

Protected areas

 Badoura Jack Pine Woodland Scientific and Natural Area
 Huntersville State Forest (part)
 Itasca State Park (part)
 Mississippi Headwaters (part)
 Paul Bunyan State Forest (part)

Demographics

2000 census
As of the 2000 census,  there were 18,376 people, 7,435 households, and 5,345 families in the county. The population density was 19.9/sqmi (7.69/km2). There were 12,229 housing units at an average density of 13.3/sqmi (5.12/km2). The racial makeup of the county was 96.31% White, 0.17% Black or African American, 2.13% Native American, 0.27% Asian, 0.01% Pacific Islander, 0.22% from other races, and 0.89% from two or more races. 0.67% of the population were Hispanic or Latino of any race. 35.0% were of German, 20.5% Norwegian, 6.0% English and 5.8% Swedish ancestry.

There were 7,435 households, out of which 29.30% had children under the age of 18 living with them, 61.10% were married couples living together, 7.10% had a female householder with no husband present, and 28.10% were non-families. 24.20% of all households were made up of individuals, and 11.30% had someone living alone who was 65 years of age or older. The average household size was 2.45 and the average family size was 2.88.

The county population contained 24.60% under the age of 18, 6.40% from 18 to 24, 24.10% from 25 to 44, 26.90% from 45 to 64, and 18.00% who were 65 years of age or older. The median age was 42 years. For every 100 females there were 99.90 males. For every 100 females age 18 and over, there were 98.00 males.

The median income for a household in the county was $35,321, and the median income for a family was $41,177. Males had a median income of $30,030 versus $21,616 for females. The per capita income for the county was $18,115. 9.70% of the population and 7.50% of families were below the poverty line. 12.50% of those under the age of 18 and 9.30% of those 65 and older were living below the poverty line.

2020 Census

Communities

Cities

 Akeley
 Laporte
 Nevis
 Park Rapids

Census-designated places
 Hubbard
 Lake George

Unincorporated communities

 Badoura
 Becida
 Benedict
 Chamberlain
 Dorset
 Emmaville
 Kabekona
 Nary

Townships

 Akeley Township
 Arago Township
 Badoura Township
 Clay Township
 Clover Township
 Crow Wing Lake Township
 Farden Township
 Fern Township
 Guthrie Township
 Hart Lake Township
 Helga Township
 Hendrickson Township
 Henrietta Township
 Hubbard Township
 Lake Alice Township
 Lake Emma Township
 Lake George Township
 Lake Hattie Township
 Lakeport Township
 Mantrap Township
 Nevis Township
 Rockwood Township
 Schoolcraft Township
 Steamboat River Township
 Straight River Township
 Thorpe Township
 Todd Township
 White Oak Township

Government and politics
Hubbard County voters have leaned toward the Republican Party for several decades. As of 2020 the county has selected the Republican candidate in 78% of presidential elections since 1980.

See also
 National Register of Historic Places listings in Hubbard County, Minnesota

References

External links
 Hubbard County government’s website
 Hubbard County Historical Society
 Hubbard County Genealogical Society

 
Minnesota counties
1883 establishments in Minnesota
Populated places established in 1883
Minnesota counties on the Mississippi River